Staffordshire is a county in the West Midlands region of England. In 1974 the historical county of Staffordshire was combined with the unitary authority of Stoke-on-Trent to form the ceremonial county of Staffordshire.

In England, buildings are given listed building status by the Secretary of State for Culture, Media and Sport, acting on the recommendation of English Heritage.  This gives the structure national recognition and protection against alteration or demolition without authorisation.  Grade I listed buildings are defined as being of "exceptional interest, sometimes considered to be internationally important"; only 2.5 per cent of listed buildings are included in this grade. This is a complete list of Grade I listed churches and chapels in Staffordshire as recorded in the National Heritage List for England.

Christian churches have existed in Staffordshire since the Anglo-Saxon era, but few Saxon features remain in its Grade I listed churches.  The churches that do contain such fabric are Holy Cross, Ilam, and St Editha, Tamworth.  Norman architecture is found in more churches, including All Saints, Alrewas, All Saints, Chebsey, and All Saints, Lapley.  Otherwise most of the churches in the list are mainly in Gothic, and those restored during the 19th century contain Gothic Revival features.  The only Neoclassical building in the list is St Mary, Ingestre.  Four of the churches were built in the 19th or 20th century: these are A. W. N. Pugin's St Giles, Cheadle (1841–46), G. F. Bodley's Holy Angels, Hoar Cross (1872–76), Richard Norman Shaw's All Saints, Leek (1885–87), and Bodley's St Chad, Burton-on-Trent (1903–10).  Few timber-framed buildings are found in the county; the only example in the list is St Margaret, Betley, which has a timber-framed core.

The county town is Stafford, but the largest settlement is Stoke-on-Trent, and the cathedral city is Lichfield.  Industry is concentrated mainly in and around Stoke-on-Trent (an area known as the Potteries because of its production of ceramics.  Most of the county is rural, with an agricultural economy.  The greatest proportion of the county's bedrock is sandstone, with some limestone deposits; these provide the major building materials for the churches.

Churches

References
Citations

Sources

 
Staffordshire
 
Lists of Grade I listed buildings in Staffordshire